Organoxenon compounds in organic chemistry contain carbon to xenon chemical bonds. The first organoxenon compounds were divalent, such as (C6F5)2Xe. The first tetravalent organoxenon compound, [C6F5XeF2][BF4], was synthesized in 2004. So far, more than one hundred organoxenon compounds have been researched.

Most of the organoxenon compounds are more unstable than xenon fluorides due to the high polarity. The molecular dipoles of xenon difluoride and xenon tetrafluoride are both 0 D. The early synthesized ones only contain perfluoro groups, but later some other groups were found, e.g. 2,4,6-trifluorophenyl.

Organoxenon(II) compounds 
The most common bivalent organoxenon compound is C6F5XeF, which is almost always used as a precursor to other organoxenon compounds. Due to the instability of xenon(II), it is difficult to synthesize organoxenon compounds by using general organic reagents. Organoxenon compounds are frequently prepared from organocadmium species including Cd(ArF)2 (where ArF is a fluorine-containing arene), C6F5SiF3, and C6F5SiMe3 (used along with fluoride).

With the use of stronger Lewis acids, such as C6F5BF2, ionic compounds like [RXe][ArFBF3] can be produced. Alkenyl and alkyl organoxenon compounds are prepared in this way as well, for example, C6F5XeCF=CF2 and C6F5XeCF3.

Some typical reactions are listed below:

2 C6F5XeF + Cd(C6F5)2 → 2 Xe(C6F5)2 + CdF2↓

C6F5XeF + (CH3)3SiCN → C6F5XeCN + (CH3)3SiF

2 C6F5XeF + Cd(2,4,6-F3C6H2)2 → 2 (2,4,6-F3C6H2)XeC6F5 + CdF2↓

The third reaction also produces (C6F5)2Xe, Xe(2,4,6-F3C6H2)2 and so on.

The precursor C6F5XeF can be prepared by the reaction of trimethyl(pentafluorophenyl)silane (C6F5SiMe3) and xenon difluoride. Adding fluoride to the adduct of C6F5XeF and arsenic pentafluoride is another method.

Arylxenon compounds with fewer fluorine substituents are also known. For instance, (2,6-F2C6H3)Xe+ and (4-FC6H4)Xe+ have been prepared, and a crystal structure of the former has been obtained, consisting of a formally 1-coordinate xenon with a long, weak contact with a fluorine on the tetrafluoroborate anion.

Organoxenon(IV) compounds 
In 2000, Karel Lutar and Boris Žemva et al. produced an ionic compound. They treated xenon tetrafluoride and difluoro(pentafluorophenyl)borane in dichloromethane at −55 °C:

XeF4 + C6F5BF2  [C6F5XeF2]+

The compound is an extremely strong fluorinating agent, and it is capable of converting (C6F5)3P to (C6F5)3PF2, C6F5I to C6F5IF2, and iodine to iodine pentafluoride.

References